Halfway Cove is a small community in the Canadian province of Nova Scotia, located in  The Municipality of the District of Guysborough in Guysborough County on the shore of Chedabucto Bay.  The community is best known for its monument to Henry Sinclair's purported discovery of North America.

References
Halfway Cove on Destination Nova Scotia

Communities in Guysborough County, Nova Scotia
General Service Areas in Nova Scotia